Karen L. Ishizuka is an independent writer, curator, and documentary producer. She is a third-generation Japanese American and her family was incarcerated during World War II.

Education and career 
Ishizuka earned a Master of Social Work degree from San Diego State University. She began her Ph.D. in the late 1970s but left to do on-the-ground community work focused on Asian American history, culture and community. Over three decades later, Ishizuka went back to school, earning her Ph.D. in Anthropology from the University of California, Los Angeles in 2015.

She is the author of Serve the People: Making Asian America in the Long Sixties and Lost and Found: Reclaiming the Japanese American Incarceration. Ishizuka was also the coeditor, alongside Patricia R. Zimmermann, of Mining the Home Movie: Excavations in Histories and Memories.

Ishizuka has served as a media producer, curator, and director of the Frank H. Watase Media Arts Center at the Japanese American National Museum (JANM). She created the Photographic and Moving Image Archive at the Museum. In 2016, Ishizuka and Robert A. Nakamura, her filmmaking partner and husband, received the inaugural JANM Legacy Award. In 2018, Ishizuka was appointed to the position of Chief Curator.

As an advocate for home movies as an important form of documentation for people of color often overlooked by mass media, Ishizuka has produced film installations that feature home movies including Through Our Own Eyes (1992), a three-screen video installation featuring home movies taken by early Issei in America in the 1920s and 1930s, and Something Strong Within (1994), which contained home movies taken by inmates in the World War II camps.

Works 
  In his Library Journal review, Joshua Wallace wrote "This fascinating study is highly recommended for those interested in Asian American history and the civil rights movement".
  Reviewed in Journal of Family Social Work.
 
  Kevin Thomas characterized this film in the Los Angeles Times as "Karen Ishizuka's eloquent, deeply moving Toyo Miyatake: Infinite Shades of Gray".

References

External links

. Several films produced by Ishizuka and directed by Robert Nakamura can be viewed on a Vimeo channel.

San Diego State University alumni
American women writers
University of California, Los Angeles alumni
American curators
American women curators
American documentary film producers
Year of birth missing (living people)
Living people
American writers of Japanese descent
21st-century American women
American women writers of Asian descent